Juventude de Pedras Salgadas is a Portuguese sports club from Pedras Salgadas.

Since 2021, the men's football team has acted, once again, as a farm team for G.D. Chaves, and plays in the Campeonato de Portugal, the fourth tier of Portuguese football. This was the third tier of Portuguese football in 2020–21, when Pedras Salgadas also played there. In the Taça de Portugal, Pedras Salgadas among others knocked Académica out of the 2018–19 edition.

References

Football clubs in Portugal
Association football clubs established in 1977
1977 establishments in Portugal